The Cecil I. and Mildred H. Dimick House at 575 West 800 North in Orem, Utah was built in 1946.  It was listed on the National Register of Historic Places in 1998.

It is a "rare example" of Art Moderne style design in Orem and in Utah more widely, built in an agrarian and war-time economy.

References

Houses completed in 1946
Houses on the National Register of Historic Places in Utah
Streamline Moderne architecture in the United States
Houses in Orem, Utah
National Register of Historic Places in Orem, Utah